Peter Marvin William Daka (born 3 November 1960) is a Zambian politician. He served as a Member of the National Assembly for Msanzala from 2016 to 2021.

Biography
In the 2001 general elections, Daka contested the Msanzala seat as the Heritage Party candidate, finishing fourth with 21% of the vote, whilst Levison Mumba of the Movement for Multi-Party Democracy (MMD) was elected. However, the results were annulled by the High Court after being petitioned by Daka. Mumba was subsequently dropped by the MMD, with Daka chosen as the new MMD candidate. In the subsequent by-election, Daka defeated Mumba (who ran as the United Party for National Development candidate) and was elected to the National Assembly. During his first term in office he became a member of the Pan-African Parliament.

Daka was re-elected in the 2006 general elections with a majority of 2,537. Following the elections he was appointed Minister of Transport and Communications. In 2007 he became Minister of Science, Technology and Vocational Training. He was moved to Minister of Agriculture and Cooperatives in 2009, before being reappointed Minister of Science, Technology and Vocational Training in 2010.

The 2011 general elections saw Daka lose his seat to Joseph Lungu, an independent candidate. After Lungu joined the Patriotic Front, Daka contested the subsequent by-election in 2012 but was defeated again.

Prior to the 2016 general elections, Daka was adopted as the Patriotic Front candidate. He was subsequently elected to the National Assembly with a 3,963 vote majority. Following the elections, losing candidate Margaret Zulu challenged Daka's election in court. However, the challenge was rejected.

Peter Daka is currently married to Priscilla Chikwama Daka.
He has seven children: Monica Daka, Peter Daka Junior, Vanessa Daka, Russell Daka, Thangu Daka, Wesley Daka and Valerio Daka.
He is a member of the Anglican Cathedral church.

References

1960 births
Living people
Movement for Multi-Party Democracy politicians
Members of the National Assembly of Zambia
Members of the Pan-African Parliament from Zambia
Transport ministers of Zambia
Higher Education ministers of Zambia
Agriculture ministers of Zambia
Patriotic Front (Zambia) politicians